Neoeudalia nigra is a species of beetle in the family Carabidae, the only species in the genus Neoeudalia.

References

Lebiinae